Ilud castle is a historical castle located in Bastak County in Hormozgan Province; the longevity of this fortress dates back to the Parthian Empire and Safavid dynasty.

References 

Castles in Iran
Parthian castles